Events in the year 1967 in Cyprus.

Incumbents 

 President: Makarios III
 President of the Parliament: Glafcos Clerides

Events 

 20 April – A Bristol Britannia of the Swiss airline Globe Air flew into the ground 3.5 kilometres (2.2 mi) south of Nicosia Airport, killing all 126 passengers and crew on board.
 15 November – The Cyprus crisis of 1967 broke out.

Deaths 

 20 April – A Bristol Britannia of the Swiss airline Globe Air flew into the ground 3.5 kilometres (2.2 mi) south of Nicosia Airport, killing all 126 passengers and crew on board.

References 

 
1960s in Cyprus
Years of the 21st century in Cyprus
Cyprus
Cyprus
Cyprus